The UCI Road World Championships – Women's team time trial was a world championship for road bicycle racing in the discipline of team time trial. It is organized by the world governing body, the Union Cycliste Internationale (UCI).

The national teams had 4 riders per team. The team time trial for trade teams was introduced in 2012 and had 6 riders per team.

National teams (1987–94)
A championship for women's national teams was introduced in 1987 and held annually until 1994. There were 4 riders per team.

Medal winners 

Source:

Medals by nation

Most successful riders

UCI teams (2012–2018)
There was a long break until a championship for trade teams was introduced in 2012. There were 6 riders per team. The championship was held up to 2018.

Medal winners

Most successful teams

Most successful riders

References 

 
Women's Team Time Trial
Women's road bicycle races
Lists of UCI Road World Championships medalists
Recurring sporting events established in 1994
Recurring sporting events disestablished in 2018